Goraya is a city in Jalandhar district and  Tehsil of the Indian state of Punjab. It lies between Jalandhar and (Ludhiana) stretch of National Highway 44 (Old NH 1), Grand Trunk Road.

Demography 
, the town has a total number of 3590 houses and the population of 16,462 of which include 8,657 are males while 7,805 are females. According to the report published by Census India in 2011, out of the total population of the village 4,864 people are from Schedule Caste and the village does not have any Schedule Tribe population so far.

Geography

Goraya is located at 31.13°N 75.77°E. It has an average elevation of 240 metres (790 ft). The town has a humid subtropical climate with cool winters and hot summers. Summers last from April to June and winters from November to February. Temperatures in summer vary from average highs of around 44 °C (111 °F) to average lows of around 25 °C (77 °F). Winter temperatures vary from highs of 19 °C (66 °F) to lows of −5 °C (23 °F). On the whole, the climate is dry except during the brief southwest monsoon season during July–August. The average annual rainfall is about 70 centimetres (28 in).

Education and religion

There are various government and public schools and colleges in Goraya J.S.F.H khalsa Senior Sec School, S.H.I.P.S, SR. Sec govt schools,  and some other private schools have been doing well as a medium of providing education to children of the area. There are places for worshipping like mandirs, dargah and gurudwaras.

Sports 
Goraya youth is always interested in sports and practice field hockey, football and cricket regularly. Famous Canadian powerlifter Harnek Singh Rai, many times Ontario and Canadian bench press and powerlifting

champion and a bronze medalist in the world in bench press is from Goraya (Boparai) He is in Brampton Sports Hall of Fame, Ontario Powerlifting Hall of Fame. Canadian Powerlifting Hall of Fame and recipient of prestigious Syl Apps Award from Ontario Government for his sports and community work for the last 40 years. He is International Powerlifting Federations' (IPF) International Referee Category one. He is also a world

class coach and looks after doping control in Canadian powerlifting. All his work in powerlifting is on voluntary without money.

References

External links
Municipal Council Goraya

Cities and towns in Jalandhar district
Villages in Phillaur tehsil